Sahar Nowrouzzadeh is an American political scientist, foreign affairs analyst, and advisor. She has worked for the United States government since 2005, particularly on issues relating to Iran–United States relations for the U.S. Department of Defense and the U.S. Department of State. She was considered instrumental in the formation of the Iran Nuclear Deal in 2015. She is the recipient the State Department Superior Honor Award, a National Intelligence Meritorious Unit Citation and the Secretary of Defense Medal for the Global War on Terrorism.

Nowrouzzadeh was born in Trumbull, Connecticut in 1982 to parents who had immigrated from Iran. At the time of her birth, her father was conducting a medical residency at Bridgeport Hospital to become an OB-GYN. As a child, she was not very interested in politics. However, following the September 11 attacks, her interest in Middle Eastern affairs grew. She studied at the Elliott School of International Affairs at George Washington University, followed by the University of Maryland-College Park. She became fluent in Persian and Arabic, as well as Spanish.

Nowrouzzadeh gained national media attention in 2017 when she was demoted from a top post in the State Department during the administration of President Donald Trump, which some speculated was due to her Iranian heritage — a position not supported by any Iranian-American civil rights group. Jeffrey Goldberg of The Atlantic referred to the group that Nowrouzzadeh worked for as “do[ing] a lot of leg-work for the Iranian regime.” And The Washington Post noted “[S]he [Nowrouzzadeh] once was at NIAC, which media have for years argued was a lobbying group for the Iranian government.”  In 2019, an internal investigation by the State Department's Inspector General confirmed that Nowrouzzadeh's demotion was due to her perceived personal political views and heritage. Nowrouzzadeh had previously been the subject of an article in the Conservative Review, a right-wing media source which falsely claimed she was born in Iran, and made other false and disparaging comments about her. The article was passed around the State Department and Nowrouzzadeh reported the issue to her supervisor, Brian Hook, but he failed to adequately respond and was found to be among the Trump administration officials who decided to abruptly reassign her.

Along with her work at the State Department, Nowrouzzadeh is also a research fellow on Iran at Harvard University.

References

1982 births
Living people
People from Trumbull, Connecticut
American politicians of Iranian descent
21st-century American women politicians
American women diplomats
American diplomats
Elliott School of International Affairs alumni
George Washington University alumni
University of Maryland, College Park alumni
Harvard Kennedy School people
Iran–United States relations
21st-century American politicians